Stalker is a 1979 Soviet science fiction art film directed by Andrei Tarkovsky with a screenplay written by Arkady and Boris Strugatsky, loosely based on their 1972 novel Roadside Picnic. 

The film tells the story of an expedition led by a figure known as the "Stalker" (Alexander Kaidanovsky), who guides his two clients—a melancholic writer (Anatoly Solonitsyn) seeking inspiration, and a professor (Nikolai Grinko) seeking scientific discovery—through a hazardous wasteland to a mysterious restricted site known simply as the "Zone", where there supposedly exists a room which grants a person's innermost desires. The film combines elements of science fiction with dramatic philosophical, psychological and theological themes.

The film was initially filmed over a year on film stock that was later discovered to be unusable, and had to be almost entirely reshot with new cinematographer Alexander Knyazhinsky. Stalker was released by Goskino in May 1979. Upon release, the film garnered mixed reviews, but in subsequent years it has been recognized as a classic of world cinema, with the British Film Institute ranking it #29 on its list of the "100 Greatest Films of All Time". The film sold over 4 million tickets, mostly in the Soviet Union, against a budget of 1 million roubles.

Title 
The meaning of the word "stalker" was derived from its use by the Strugatsky brothers in their novel Roadside Picnic, upon which the movie is based. In Roadside Picnic, "Stalker" was a common nickname for men engaged in the illegal enterprise of prospecting for and smuggling alien artifacts out of the "Zone".  According to author Boris Strugatsky, "prospectors" and "trappers" were potential word choices before "stalker" was decided on, which was at least partially inspired by Rudyard Kipling's character "Stalky" in his Stalky & Co. stories, of which both authors were fans.  Their adaptation of the English word into Russian is pronounced slightly differently as "Stullker", and it came into common usage after being "coined" by the authors.

Tarkovsky also wrote "Stalker is from the word 'to stalk'—to creep." in a 1976 diary entry.

In the film, a "stalker" is a professional guide to the Zone, someone having the ability and desire to cross the border into the dangerous and forbidden place with a specific goal.

Plot 
The protagonist (Alexander Kaidanovsky) works in an unnamed location as a "Stalker" leading people through the "Zone", an area in which the normal laws of physics do not apply and remnants of seemingly extraterrestrial activity lie undisturbed among its ruins. The Zone contains a place called the "Room", said to grant the wishes of anyone who steps inside. The area containing the Zone is shrouded in secrecy, sealed off by the government and surrounded by ominous hazards.

At home with his wife and daughter, the Stalker's wife (Alisa Freindlich) begs him not to go into the Zone, but he dismissively rejects her pleas. In a rundown bar-café, the Stalker meets his next clients for a trip into the Zone, the Writer (Anatoly Solonitsyn) and the Professor (Nikolai Grinko).

They evade the military blockade that guards the Zone by following a train inside the gate and ride into the heart of the Zone on a  railway work car. The Stalker tells his clients they must do exactly as he says to survive the dangers which lie ahead and explains that the Zone must be respected and the straightest path is not always the shortest path. The Stalker tests for various "traps" by throwing metal nuts tied to strips of cloth ahead of them. He refers to a previous Stalker named "Porcupine", who had led his brother to his death in the Zone, visited the Room, come into possession of a large sum of money, and shortly afterwards committed suicide. The Writer is skeptical of any real danger, but the Professor generally follows the Stalker's advice.

As they travel, the three men discuss their reasons for wanting to visit the Room. The Writer expresses his fear of losing his inspiration. The Professor seems less anxious, although he insists on carrying along a small backpack. The Professor admits he hopes to win a Nobel Prize for scientific analysis of the Zone. The Stalker insists he has no motive beyond the altruistic aim of aiding the desperate to their desires.

After traveling through the tunnels, the three finally reach their destination: a decayed and decrepit industrial building. In a small antechamber, a phone rings. The surprised Professor decides to use the phone to telephone a colleague. As the trio approach the Room, the Professor reveals his true intentions in undertaking the journey. The Professor has brought a 20-kiloton bomb with him, and he intends to destroy the Room to prevent its use by evil men. The three men enter a physical and verbal standoff just outside the Room that leaves them exhausted.

The Writer realizes that when Porcupine met his goal, despite his conscious motives, the room fulfilled Porcupine's secret desire for wealth rather than bring back his brother from death. This prompted the guilt-ridden Porcupine to commit suicide. The Writer tells them that no one in the whole world is able to know their true desires and as such it is impossible to use the Room for selfish reasons. The Professor gives up on his plan of destroying the Room. Instead, he disassembles his bomb and scatters its pieces. No one attempts to enter the Room.

The Stalker, the Writer, and the Professor are met back at the bar-café by the Stalker's wife and daughter. After returning home, the Stalker tells his wife how humanity has lost its faith and belief needed for both traversing the Zone and living a good life. As the Stalker sleeps, his wife contemplates their relationship in a monologue delivered directly to the camera. In the last scene, Martyshka, the couple's deformed daughter, sits alone in the kitchen reading as a love poem by Fyodor Tyutchev is recited. She appears to use psychokinesis to push three drinking glasses across the table, one falling off. A train passes by where the Stalker's family lives, and the entire apartment shakes.

Cast 
 Alexander Kaidanovsky as the Stalker
 Anatoly Solonitsyn as the Writer
 Alisa Freindlich as the Stalker's wife
 Nikolai Grinko as the Professor (voiced by Sergei Yakovlev)
 Natasha Abramova as Martyshka, the Stalker's daughter
 Faime Jurno as the Writer's interlocutress
 Evgeniy Kostin as Lyuger, owner of the bar-café (credited as E. Kostin)
 Raimo Rendi as the patrolman
 Vladimir Zamansky as the Professor's telephone interlocutor

Themes and interpretations 
In a review in Slant Magazine, critic Nick Schager describes the film as a "dense, complex, often-contradictory, and endlessly pliable allegory about human consciousness, the necessity for faith in an increasingly secular, rational world, and the ugly, unpleasant dreams and desires that reside in the hearts of men", while conceding that the obliqueness of the imagery renders definitive interpretation "both pointless... [and] somewhat futile".

Several critics have identified the nature of human desire as a central theme of the film. James Berardinelli interprets the film as suggesting that "one's innermost desire may not be what one thinks it is and that one may be better off not achieving it", while Schager describes the film as capturing "the essence of what man is made of... a yearning for something that's simultaneously beyond our reach and yet intrinsic to every one of us".

Geoff Dyer argues the Stalker is "seeking asylum from the world", and says that "while the film may not be about the gulag, it is haunted by memories of the camps, from the overlap of vocabulary ("Zona", "the meat grinder") to the Stalker's Zek-style shaved head".

The film's mysterious Zone has drawn comparisons with the Chernobyl Exclusion Zone that was established in 1986 (seven years after the release of the film) in the aftermath of the Chernobyl disaster, and some of the people employed to take care of the abandoned Chernobyl power plant referred to themselves as "stalkers". Though the film does not specify the origin of the Zone, near the end, in a shot of the Stalker with his family outside the Zone, what appears to be a power plant is visible in the background. The themes of nuclear radiation and environmental degradation would be revisited by Tarkovsky in his final film, The Sacrifice.

Midway in the film, the Stalker has an interior monologue in which he quotes the entire section 76 of Lao Tse's Tao Te Ching, the text of which characterizes softness and pliancy as qualities of a newborn, hence, new life; hardness and strength, on the contrary, are qualities nearing death. ("Man, when he enters life, is soft and weak. When he dies he is hard and strong.")

Production

Writing 
After reading the novel Roadside Picnic, by Arkady and Boris Strugatsky, Tarkovsky initially recommended it to a friend, the film director Mikhail Kalatozov, thinking Kalatozov might be interested in adapting it into a film. Kalatozov abandoned the project when he could not obtain the rights to the novel. Tarkovsky then became very interested in adapting the novel and expanding its concepts. He hoped it would allow him to make a film which conformed to the classical Aristotelian unity; a single action, on a single location, within 24 hours (single point in time).

Tarkovsky viewed the idea of the Zone as a dramatic tool to draw out the personalities of the three protagonists, particularly the psychological damage from everything that happens to the idealistic views of the Stalker as he finds himself unable to make others happy: "This, too, is what Stalker is about: the hero goes through moments of despair when his faith is shaken; but every time he comes to a renewed sense of his vocation to serve people who have lost their hopes and illusions." The film departs considerably from the novel. According to an interview with Tarkovsky in 1979, the film has basically nothing in common with the novel except for the two words "Stalker" and "Zone".

Yet, several similarities remain between the novel and the film. In both works, the Zone is guarded by a police or military guard, apparently authorized to use deadly force. The Stalker in both works tests the safety of his path by tossing nuts and bolts tied with scraps of cloth, verifying that gravity is working as usual. A character named Porcupine is a mentor to Stalker. In the novel, frequent visits to the Zone increase the likelihood of abnormalities in the visitor's offspring. In the book, the Stalker's daughter has light hair all over her body, while in the film she is crippled and has psychokinetic abilities. The 'meat grinder', a particularly perilous location, is mentioned in both film and the book. Neither in the novel nor in the film do the women enter the Zone — indeed, the film features a female character who is introduced as wishing to enter the Zone, but who is dismissed by the Stalker prior to departure. Finally, the target of the expedition in both works is a wish-granting device.

In Roadside Picnic, the site was specifically described as the site of alien visitation; the name of the novel derives from a metaphor proposed by a character who compares the visit to a roadside picnic. The closing monologue by the Stalker's wife at the end of the film has no equivalent in the novel. An early draft of the screenplay was published as a novel Stalker, or  The Wish Machine, that differs substantially from the finished film.

Production 
In an interview on the MK2 DVD, the production designer, Rashit Safiullin, recalled that Tarkovsky spent a year shooting all the outdoor scenes. However, when the crew returned to Moscow, they found that the film had been improperly developed and their footage was unusable. The film had been shot on new Kodak 5247 stock with which Soviet laboratories were not very familiar. Even before the film stock problem was discovered, relations between Tarkovsky and Stalkers first cinematographer, Georgy Rerberg, had deteriorated. After seeing the poorly developed material, Tarkovsky fired Rerberg. Safiullin contends that Tarkovsky was so despondent at having to discard all the outdoor work that he wanted to abandon further work on the film.

After the loss of the film stock, the Soviet film boards wanted to shut the film down, but Tarkovsky came up with a solution: he asked to be allowed to make a two-part film, which meant additional deadlines and more funds. Tarkovsky ended up reshooting almost all of the film with a new cinematographer, Alexander Knyazhinsky. According to Safiullin, the finished version of Stalker is completely different from the one Tarkovsky originally shot.

The documentary film Rerberg and Tarkovsky: The Reverse Side of "Stalker" by Igor Mayboroda offers a different interpretation of the relationship between Rerberg and Tarkovsky. Rerberg felt that Tarkovsky was not ready for this script. He told Tarkovsky to rewrite the script in order to achieve a good result. Tarkovsky ignored him and continued shooting. After several arguments, Tarkovsky sent Rerberg home. People who have seen both the first version shot by Rerberg (as Director of Photography) and the final theatrical release say that they are almost identical. Tarkovsky sent home other crew members in addition to Rerberg, excluding them from the credits, as well.

The central part of the film, in which the characters travel within the Zone, was shot in a few days at two deserted hydro power plants on the Jägala river near Tallinn, Estonia. The shot before they enter the Zone is an old Flora chemical factory in the center of Tallinn, next to the old Rotermann salt storage (now Museum of Estonian Architecture), and the former Tallinn Power Plant, now Tallinn Creative Hub, where a memorial plate of the film was set up in 2008. Some shots within the Zone were filmed in Maardu, next to the Iru Power Plant, while the shot with the gates to the Zone was filmed in Lasnamäe, next to Punane Street behind the Idakeskus. Other shots were filmed near the Tallinn–Narva highway bridge on the Pirita river.

Several people involved in the film production, and possibly Tarkovsky himself, died from causes that some crew members attributed to the film's long shooting schedule in toxic locations. Sound designer Vladimir Sharun recalled:

Style 
Like Tarkovsky's other films, Stalker relies on long takes with slow, subtle camera movement, rejecting the use of rapid montage. The film contains 142 shots in 163 minutes, with an average shot length of more than one minute and many shots lasting for more than four minutes. Almost all of the scenes not set in the Zone are in sepia or a similar high-contrast brown monochrome.

Soundtrack 
The Stalker film score was composed by Eduard Artemyev, who had also composed the scores for Tarkovsky's previous films Solaris and Mirror. For Stalker, Artemyev composed and recorded two different versions of the score. The first score was done with an orchestra alone but was rejected by Tarkovsky. The second score that was used in the final film was created on a synthesizer along with traditional instruments that were manipulated using sound effects.

In the final film score, the boundaries between music and sound were blurred, as natural sounds and music interact to the point where they are indistinguishable. In fact, many of the natural sounds were not production sounds but were created by Artemyev on his synthesizer.

For Tarkovsky, music was more than just a parallel illustration of the visual image. He believed that music distorts and changes the emotional tone of a visual image while not changing the meaning. He also believed that in a film with complete theoretical consistency music will have no place and that instead music is replaced by sounds. According to Tarkovsky, he aimed at this consistency and moved into this direction in Stalker and Nostalghia.

In addition to the original monophonic soundtrack, the Russian Cinema Council (Ruscico) created an alternative 5.1 surround sound track for the 2001 DVD release. In addition to remixing the mono soundtrack, music and sound effects were removed and added in several scenes. Music was added to the scene where the three are traveling to the Zone on a motorized draisine. In the opening and the final scene Beethoven's Ninth Symphony was removed and in the opening scene in Stalker's house ambient sounds were added, changing the original soundtrack, in which this scene was completely silent except for the sound of a train.

Film score 

Initially, Tarkovsky had no clear understanding of the musical atmosphere of the final film and only an approximate idea where in the film the music was to be. Even after he had shot all the material he continued his search for the ideal film score, wanting a combination of Oriental and Western music. In a conversation with Artemyev he explained that he needed music that reflects the idea that although the East and the West can coexist, they are not able to understand each other. One of Tarkovsky's ideas was to perform Western music on Oriental instruments (or vice versa). Artemyev proposed to try this idea with the motet Pulcherrima Rosa by an anonymous 14th century Italian composer dedicated to the Virgin Mary.

In its original form Tarkovsky did not perceive the motet as suitable for the film and asked Artemyev to give it an Oriental sound. Later, Tarkovsky proposed to invite musicians from Armenia and Azerbaijan and to let them improvise on the melody of the motet. A musician was invited from Azerbaijan who played the main melody on a tar based on mugham, accompanied by orchestral background music written by Artemyev. Tarkovsky, who, unusually for him, attended the full recording session, rejected the final result as not what he was looking for.

Rethinking their approach, they finally found the solution in a theme that would create a state of inner calmness and inner satisfaction, or as Tarkovsky said "space frozen in a dynamic equilibrium". Artemyev knew about a musical piece from Indian classical music where a prolonged and unchanged background tone is performed on a tanpura. As this gave Artemyev the impression of frozen space, he used this inspiration and created a background tone on his synthesizer similar to the background tone performed on the tanpura. The tar then improvised on the background sound, together with a flute as a European, Western instrument. To mask the obvious combination of European and Oriental instruments he passed the foreground music through the effect channels of his SYNTHI 100 synthesizer. These effects included modulating the sound of the flute and lowering the speed of the tar, so that what Artemyev called "the life of one string" could be heard. Tarkovsky was amazed by the result, especially liking the sound of the tar, and used the theme without any alterations in the film.

Sound design 
The title sequence is accompanied by Artemyev's main theme. The opening sequence of the film showing Stalker's room is mostly silent. Periodically one hears what could be a train. The sound becomes louder and clearer over time until the sound and the vibrations of objects in the room give a sense of a train's passing by without the train being visible. This aural impression is quickly subverted by the muffled sound of Beethoven's Symphony No. 9. The source of this music is unclear, thus setting the tone for the blurring of reality in the film. For this part of the film Tarkovsky was also considering music by Richard Wagner or the Marseillaise.

In an interview with Tonino Guerra in 1979, Tarkovsky said that he wanted: "...music that is more or less popular, that expresses the movement of the masses, the theme of humanity's social destiny...But this music must be barely heard beneath the noise, in a way that the spectator is not aware of it."

The journey into the Zone on a motorized rail car features a disconnection between the visual image and the sound. The presence of the rail car is registered only through the clanking sound of the wheels on the tracks. Neither the rail car nor the scenery passing by is shown, since the camera is focused on the faces of the characters. This disconnection draws the audience into the inner world of the characters and transforms the physical journey into an inner journey. This effect on the audience is reinforced by Artemyev's synthesizer effects, which make the clanking wheels sound less and less natural as the journey progresses. When the three arrive in the Zone initially, it appears to be silent. Only after some time, and only slightly audibly can one hear the sound of a distant river, the sound of the blowing wind, or the occasional cry of an animal. These sounds grow richer and more audible while the Stalker makes his first venture into the Zone, as if the sound draws him towards the Zone. The sparseness of sounds in the Zone draws attention to specific sounds, which, as in other scenes, are largely disconnected from the visual image. Animals can be heard in the distance but are never shown. A breeze can be heard, but no visual reference is shown. This effect is reinforced by occasional synthesizer effects which meld with the natural sounds and blur the boundaries between artificial and alien sounds and the sounds of nature.

During the journey in the Zone, the sound of water becomes more and more prominent, which, combined with the visual image, presents the Zone as a drenched world. In an interview Tarkovsky dismissed the idea that water has a symbolic meaning in his films, saying that there was so much rain in his films because it is always raining in Russia. In another interview, on the film Nostalghia, however, he said "Water is a mysterious element, a single molecule of which is very photogenic. It can convey movement and a sense of change and flux." Emerging from the tunnel called the "meat grinder" by the Stalker, they arrive at the entrance of their destination, the room. Here, as in the rest of the film, sound is constantly changing and not necessarily connected to the visual image. The journey in the Zone ends with the three sitting in the room, silent, with no audible sound. When the sound resumes, it is again the sound of water but with a different timbre, softer and gentler, as if to give a sense of catharsis and hope. The transition back to the world outside the Zone is supported by sound. While the camera still shows a pool of water inside the Zone, the audience begins to hear the sound of a train and Ravel's Boléro, reminiscent of the opening scene. The soundscape of the world outside the Zone is the same as before, characterized by train wheels, foghorns of a ship and train whistles. The film ends as it began, with the sound of a train passing by, accompanied by the muffled sound of Beethoven's Symphony No. 9, this time the Ode to Joy from the final moments of the symphony. As in the rest of the film the disconnect between the visual image and the sound leaves the audience unclear whether the sound is real or an illusion.

Reception

Critical response 
Upon its release the film's reception was less than favorable. Officials at Goskino, a government group otherwise known as the State Committee for Cinematography, were critical of the film. On being told that Stalker should be faster and more dynamic, Tarkovsky replied:

The Goskino representative then stated that he was trying to give the point of view of the audience. Tarkovsky supposedly retorted:

More recently, reviews of the film have been highly positive. It earned a place in the British Film Institute's "100 Greatest Films of All Time" poll conducted for Sight & Sound in September 2012. The group's critics listed Stalker at joint #29. Directors ranked it at #30. In The Guardian, Geoff Dyer described the film as "synonymous both with cinema's claims to high art and a test of the viewer's ability to appreciate it as such". Critic Derek Adams of the Time Out Film Guide has compared Stalker to Francis Ford Coppola's Apocalypse Now, also released in 1979, and argued that "as a journey to the heart of darkness" Stalker looks "a good deal more persuasive than Coppola's." Slant Magazine reviewer Nick Schager has praised the film as an "endlessly pliable allegory about human consciousness".

In 2018, the film was voted the 49th greatest non-English-language film of all time in a poll by BBC Culture involving 209 critics in 43 countries.

On review aggregator Rotten Tomatoes, the film is rated at 100% based on 41 reviews with an average rating of 8.6/10. Its critical consensus states, "Stalker is a complex, oblique parable that draws unforgettable images and philosophical musings from its sci-fi/thriller setting."

Box office 
Stalker sold 4.3 million tickets in the Soviet Union.

Awards 
The film was awarded the Prize of the Ecumenical Jury at the Cannes Film Festival, and the Audience Jury Award – Special Mention at Fantasporto, Portugal.

Home media 
 In East Germany, DEFA did a complete German dubbed version of the movie which was shown in cinema in 1982. This was used by Icestorm Entertainment on a DVD release, but was heavily criticized for its lack of the original language version, subtitles and had an overall bad image quality.
 RUSCICO produced a version for the international market containing the film on two DVDs with remastered audio and video. It contains the original Russian audio in an enhanced Dolby Digital 5.1 remix as well as the original mono version. The DVD also contains subtitles in 13 languages and interviews with cameraman Alexander Knyazhinsky, painter and production designer Rashit Safiullin and composer Eduard Artemyev.
 Criterion Collection released a remastered edition DVD and Blu-Ray on 17 July 2017. Included in the special features is an interview with film critic Geoff Dyer, author of the book Zona: A Book About a Film About a Journey to a Room.

Influence and legacy

Cultural events 
 The film heavily influenced the Cacophony Society, which began in 1986 in the San Francisco Bay Area and which organized "Zone Trips" for participants.
 The first burning of a wooden, symbolic man at Black Rock Desert, Nevada, occurred on "Zone Trip Number 4" in 1990. This occasion evolved into an enormous annual festival of arts, music, culture called Burning Man.

Film and television 

 The French filmmaker Chris Marker used Tarkovsky's concept of "The Zone" from the film for his film, Sans Soleil (1983).  
Stalker, the Russian International Human Rights Film Festival, was named after the film at its founding in 1995.

 The 2012 film Chernobyl Diaries also involves a tour guide, similar to a stalker, giving groups "extreme tours" of the Chernobyl area.
 Jonathan Nolan, co-creator of Westworld (2016–), cites Stalker as an influence on his work for the HBO series.
 In the 2017 film Atomic Blonde, the protagonist Lorraine Broughton goes into an East Berlin theater showing Stalker.
 Annihilation (2018), a science fiction psychological horror film written and directed by Alex Garland, although based on the eponymous novel by Jeff VanderMeer, for some critics seems to have obvious similarities with the Roadside Picnic and Stalker. However, such notions prompted the author of the Annihilation novel, upon which the movie is based, to state that his story "is 100% NOT a tribute to Picnic/Stalker" via his official Twitter account.

Literature 
 In 2012, the English writer Geoff Dyer published Zona: A Book About a Film About a Journey to a Room drawing together his personal observations as well as critical insights about the film and the experience of watching it.

Music 
 In the song "Dissidents" from the 1984 album The Flat Earth by Thomas Dolby, the bridge between two verses includes a narrative from the film.
 The track "The Avenue" by British group Orchestral Manoeuvres in the Dark samples the sound of a train in motion, recorded directly from the film. Band member and songwriter Andy McCluskey refers to the film as, “One of the most haunting pieces of film and music that I ever saw". The track features as a B-side on the group's 1984 hit single Locomotion.
 Stalker was the inspiration for the 1995 album of the same title by Robert Rich and B. Lustmord, which has been noted for its eerie soundscapes and dark ambience.
 Ambient music duo Stars of the Lid sampled the ending of Stalker in their song "Requiem for Dying Mothers, Part 2", released on their 2001 album The Tired Sounds of Stars of the Lid.
The Prodigy's music video "Breathe" is heavily influenced by film's visuals and cinematography.
 The lyrics of the 2013 album Pelagial by the progressive metal band The Ocean are inspired by the film.

Video games 
 In 2007, the Ukrainian video-game developer GSC Game World published S.T.A.L.K.E.R.: Shadow of Chernobyl, an open-world, first-person shooter loosely based on both the film and the original novel.
 The entire Metro video game series is partly influenced by the novel Roadside Picnic, on which the film was based.

Notes

References

External links 

 
 
 
 
 Stalker, released on official Mosfilm YouTube channel, with subtitles in multiple languages
 Stalker at Nostalghia.com, a website dedicated to Tarkovsky, featuring interviews with members of the production team
 Geopeitus.ee – filming locations of Stalker 
 A unique perspective on the making of Stalker: The testimony of a mechanic toiling away under Tarkovsky's guidance – article on the production of Stalker
 Stalker: Meaning and Making an essay by Mark Le Fanu at the Criterion Collection
 Машина желаний. Стругацкие и Тарковский

1970s avant-garde and experimental films
1970s science fiction drama films
1979 films
Existentialist films
Films about religion
Films based on Russian novels
Films based on science fiction novels
Films based on works by Arkady and Boris Strugatsky
Films directed by Andrei Tarkovsky
Films scored by Eduard Artemyev
Films shot in Estonia
Films shot in Moscow
Films shot in Tajikistan
Films partially in color
Metaphysical fiction films
Mosfilm films
Rail transport films
1970s Russian-language films
Russian science fiction drama films
Russian dystopian films
Soviet avant-garde and experimental films
Soviet science fiction drama films
1979 drama films